Bernard "Josh" Lay (born September 8, 1982) is a former American football cornerback. He was drafted by the New Orleans Saints in the sixth round of the 2006 NFL Draft. He played college football at Pittsburgh.

Lay was also a member of the St. Louis Rams, California Redwoods, and Pittsburgh Power.

Early years
Lay attended Aliquippa High School, where he was a three-year starter at cornerback. He was a prep school quarterback, wide receiver and cornerback at Valley Forge Military Academy in 2001 before attending Pittsburgh.

Professional career

New Orleans Saints
Lay was selected in the sixth round (174th pick overall) of the 2006 NFL Draft by the New Orleans Saints. On July 17, 2006, he agreed to a three-year contract with the Saints. He was waived by the Saints on September 1.

St. Louis Rams
Lay was signed by the Rams on December 13, 2006. The team assigned him to the Berlin Thunder of NFL Europa on February 24, 2007. The Rams waived Lay on August 31, 2007. He was then signed to their practice squad on September 5, 2007. He was released from the practice squad on September 11, 2007.

California Redwoods
Lay was signed by the California Redwoods of the United Football League on September 2, 2009.

Pittsburgh Power
Lay was signed by the Pittsburgh Power of the Arena Football League on February 24, 2011. During the 2011 season, he played in 14 games for the Power, starting 10. He made 34.5 tackles and intercepted 4 passes, returning 1 for a touchdown. He re-signed with the team on December 5, 2011. However, following a players' strike, Lay was placed on League Suspension on April 5, 2012, where he remained for the entirety of the 2012 season.

Personal
Lay is a cousin of NFL cornerback Ty Law. His given first name is Bernard, "Josh" is a nickname.

On April 7, 2011, Lay was arrested in his hometown of Aliquippa, and charged with drug possession with intent to deliver and possession of a controlled substance.

References

External links
Pittsburgh Panthers bio
United Football League bio

1982 births
Living people
People from Aliquippa, Pennsylvania
Players of American football from Pennsylvania
American football cornerbacks
Pittsburgh Panthers football players
New Orleans Saints players
St. Louis Rams players
Berlin Thunder players
Sacramento Mountain Lions players
Pittsburgh Power players